Wesley Lloyd (July 24, 1883 – January 10, 1936) was an American attorney and politician from Tacoma, Washington. A Democrat, he was most notable for his service as a U.S. Representative from 1933 to 1936.

Early life
Lloyd was born in Arvonia, Osage County, Kansas, on July 24, 1883, the son of John Q. Lloyd and Mary Anne (Roberts) Lloyd. He graduated from the schools of Osage County, then attended Baker University, Baldwin, Kansas, and Washburn College.

Career
Lloyd became a newspaper reporter and worked for papers in Kansas City, Missouri, Topeka, Kansas, and Butte, Montana. While working as a reporter, Lloyd attended courses at the Kansas City Law School. He received his LL.B. degree in 1906, was admitted to the bar, and moved to Tacoma, Washington, where he worked as a reporter while establishing a law practice.

In 1908, he began the fulltime practice of law, and was the unsuccessful Democratic, nominee for prosecuting attorney of Pierce County. In 1910, he ran unsuccessfully for a seat in the Washington House of Representatives. During World War I, Lloyd joined Company F, 3rd Infantry Regiment, a unit of the Washington National Guard. He served from 1918 to 1920, and attained the rank of corporal. In 1920, he was again the unsuccessful Democratic nominee for county prosecutor. In 1924, Lloyd was an unsuccessful candidate for judge of the Washington Superior Court.

In 1931, Lloyd was appointed a special assistant prosecuting attorney for Thurston County, a role in which he served without pay. He also continued to serve as one of the leaders of the Democratic Party in Pierce County, including president of the county's Men's Democratic Club.

U.S. Congress
In 1932 Lloyd was elected to the United States House of Representatives. He was reelected in 1934, and served in the 73rd and 74th Congresses (March 4, 1933 until his death). During his congressional service, Lloyd served on the Judiciary Committee and was appointed to a leadership role as regional whip for Washington, Oregon, and California.

Serving in Congress during the economic downturn of the Great Depression, on May 9, 1933, Lloyd proposed an unsuccessful constitutional amendment that would have placed a maximum limit on individual net worth. Lloyd died in Washington, D.C. on January 10, 1936. He was interred at Tacoma Cemetery in Tacoma.

Personal life
In 1910, Lloyd married Iva Reedy of Spokane, Washington. They were the parents of three children.

Lloyd was a hunter and fisherman, and carried out several lengthy excursions to remote areas of western Washington. He was active in civic organizations, and was a member of the Fraternal Order of Eagles and Benevolent and Protective Order of Elks. Lloyd was also active in Freemasonry, and belonged to the Shriners and Order of the Eastern Star, in addition to receiving the 32nd degree of the Scottish Rite.

See also
 List of United States Congress members who died in office (1900–49)

Notes

References

External links

1883 births
1936 deaths
20th-century American politicians
Democratic Party members of the United States House of Representatives from Washington (state)
People from Osage County, Kansas
Politicians from Tacoma, Washington
Washington (state) lawyers
Washington National Guard personnel
Baker University alumni
University of Missouri–Kansas City alumni
Washburn University alumni
20th-century American lawyers